Acacia calyculata is a shrub belonging to the genus Acacia and the subgenus Juliflorae that is native to north eastern Australia.

Description
Like most species of Acacia it has phyllodes rather than true leaves. Following flowering linear shaped seed pods with a linear shape that tapers towards the base.

Distribution
It is endemic to Queensland where it is situated in coastal areas from the Cape York Peninsula down to around Townsville in the south. It is often found on steep hillsides growing in shallow rocky soils derived from granite or sandstone as a  part of Eucalyptus woodlands or open forest communities but can also be found in heath or scrubland area growing in sandy soils near the coast.

See also
List of Acacia species

References

calyculata
Flora of Queensland
Taxa named by Allan Cunningham (botanist)
Plants described in 1842